The following polls make up the 1991 NCAA Division I baseball rankings.  Baseball America began publishing its poll of the top 20 teams in college baseball in 1981.  Beginning with the 1985 season, it expanded to the top 25.  Collegiate Baseball Newspaper published its first human poll of the top 20 teams in college baseball in 1957, and expanded to rank the top 30 teams in 1961.

Baseball America
Currently, only the final poll from the 1991 season is available.

Collegiate Baseball
Currently, only the final poll from the 1991 season is available.

References

 
College baseball rankings in the United States